Sirio Carrapa (born 12 May 1952 in Borgagne) is an Italian teacher and practitioner of mysticism and Surat Shabd Yoga in the Sant Mat tradition. He was a disciple of Kirpal Singh and Ajaib Singh, and he is acknowledged as a spiritual Master ("Sant" or Satguru), carrying on the work of his Masters.

Biography 
He was born on 12 May, in 1952 in Borgagne, which is in one of the southernmost regions of Italy, Apulia. He lived there with his parents and four siblings until the age of 10, then in 1962 the family moved to Milan. He lived there until he moved to Tuscany, in the village Ribolla (Grosseto) in 1979, where he founded the Sant Bani Ashram.

Bibliography 
 Il Cammino Verso L'Illuminazione, autobiography and Sant Mat theory, M.I.R. Edizioni (cover) 
 Il Roseto dell'Amico, collection of writings and verses of Sirio Carrapa available for download, Creative Common license.
 Nel Giardino dai Melograni in Fiore, collection of poetry and bhajan by Sirio Carrapa. available for download, Creative Common license.
 One Word. One Melody. One Glance, satsang collection in English available for download, Creative Common license.
 Erleuchtungsweg Eines Westlichen Adepten German translation of 'Il Cammino Verso L'Illuminazione'.   ; 
 Tautropfen auf den Rosen und Granatäpfeln im Garten des Freundes: Gedichte und Bhajans German: Stories and poems (bhajans).   ;

 Egy Szó. Egy Dallam. Egy Pillantás collection of discourses, lectures, letters and poems in Hungarian.  , published by SBA Books and Könyvműhely Kiadó, December 2012.
  The Rosegarden of the Friend collection of writings and poems. Published by SBA Books, August 2012.
  In the garden with pomegrantes in flower collection of poems. Published by SBA Books, August 2012.
  The Way of the Saints a writing on Surat Shabd Yoga or Sant Mat. Published by SBA Books, August 2012.

See also
 Surat Shabd Yoga

References

External links 

 Sirio Satsang hold by disciples of Sirio Carrapa.
 Sant Bani Ashram - Ribolla hold by disciples of Sirio Carrapa.
 Guru Lineage Chart, Baba Jaimal Singh to Shri Sirio Carrapa.
 Golden Mountain magazin (in Hungarian) - a section on the teachings of Master Sirio
 A Hungarian site that is reporting about Master Sirio and his spiritual activity in Hungary, such as public lectures and spiritual retreats

1952 births
Living people
Contemporary Sant Mat
Italian male writers
People from the Province of Lecce
Radha Soami
Sant Mat gurus
Spiritual teachers
Spiritual writers
Surat Shabd Yoga